The 1966–67 Yugoslav Second League season was the 21st season of the Second Federal League, the second level association football competition of SFR Yugoslavia, since its establishment in 1946. The league was contested in two regional groups (West Division and East Division), with 18 clubs each.

West Division

Teams
A total of eighteen teams contested the league, including fourteen sides from the 1965–66 season, one club relegated from the 1965–66 Yugoslav First League and three sides promoted from the third tier leagues played in the 1965–66 season. The league was contested in a double round robin format, with each club playing every other club twice, for a total of 34 rounds. Two points were awarded for wins and one point for draws.

Trešnjevka were relegated from the 1965–66 Yugoslav First League after finishing in the 16th place of the league table. The three clubs promoted to the second level were Aluminij, Bratstvo Travnik and BSK Slavonski Brod.

League table

East Division

Teams
A total of eighteen teams contested the league, including fourteen sides from the 1965–66 season, one club relegated from the 1965–66 Yugoslav First League and three sides promoted from the third tier leagues played in the 1965–66 season. The league was contested in a double round robin format, with each club playing every other club twice, for a total of 34 rounds. Two points were awarded for wins and one point for draws.

Radnički Belgrade were relegated from the 1965–66 Yugoslav First League after finishing in the 15th place of the league table. The three clubs promoted to the second level were Crvenka, Rabotnički and Radnički Kragujevac.

League table

See also
1966–67 Yugoslav First League
1966–67 Yugoslav Cup

Yugoslav Second League seasons
Yugo
2